Håkon Games Kornstad (born 5 April 1977 in Oslo, Norway) is a Norwegian jazz musician (tenor saxophone, bass saxophone, flute and live looping) and classically trained singer (tenor), known from bands such as Wibutee and Kornstad Trio, and collaborations with musicians such as Ketil Bjørnstad, Anja Garbarek, Live Maria Roggen, Bugge Wesseltoft, Sidsel Endresen, Paal Nilssen-Love, Mats Eilertsen, Knut Reiersrud, Jon Christensen, Eivind Aarset, and Pat Metheny.

Career 

Kornstad was educated in the Jazz Program at Trondheim Musikkonservatorium. During his studies he founded the jazz trio Triangle, together with Per Zanussi (bass) and Wetle Holte (drums). Later, Erlend Skomsvoll (piano) and Live Maria Roggen (vocals) joined the band, and this lineup evolved to become the band Wibutee (1998). He also put together the Håkon Kornstad Trio with Paal Nilssen-Love and Mats Eilertsen (1998–2003). Kornstad's collaboration with Håvard Wiik was manifested in two albums of duo recordings in 2001. He was involved with the free improvisation bands Tri-Dim and No Spaghetti Edition, and started the band Atomic in 2000. Kornstad has also been part of the bands of Bugge Wesseltoft (1999–2003), Anja Garbarek (2006–), and Sidsel Endresen (2008–).

Since 2003 Kornstad has focused on his solo projects, in which he plays acoustic saxophones along with electronics in an improvised setting, usually giving solo performances. These have also featured guest appearances from Knut Reiersrud, Ingebrigt Håker Flaten, Jon Christensen and beatboxer Julian Sommerfelt. In addition to saxophones and electronics, Kornstad plays something he calls the "flutonett", which is a flute coupled with a clarinet mouthpiece.

During a stay in New York in 2009 Kornstad became interested in opera, and began taking singing lessons with teachers there. From the autumn of 2011 he has been a student at Operahøgskolen (KHiO), and debuted as a tenor singer in Den Norske Opera in February 2012 as Il Podesta in a student production of the Mozart opera La finta giardiniera. In 2011 he was nominated for the Spellemannprisen, in the category of This Year's Jazz Record, for Symphonies in My Head (Jazzland, 2011). He then presented his new project, Tenor Battle, combining opera and jazz, at the International Jazz Festival Nattjazz in Bergen. The new band could best be described as a sort of updated salon orchestra, inspired by the LP era, where jazz standards coexist with opera arias and ballads are followed by improvisations in the known Kornstad style. Kornstad is known as one of the premier Norwegian saxophonists, with a tone so hot that one can be melted freely, his voice has the same impact.

Honors 
2002: Kongsberg Jazz Award, within the Håkon Kornstad Trio
2012: Enlisted as "Talent deserving further recognition" on tenor saxophone in Down Beat's annual critics poll
2014: Guinness Jazz in Europe Award
2015: Buddyprisen

Discography

As leader 
Solo albums
Single Engine (Jazzland Recordings, 2007), with Bugge Wesseltoft (Hammond B3 Organ), Knut Reiersrud (guitar), Ingebrigt Håker Flaten (double bass)
Dwell Time (Jazzland Recordings, 2009), with recordings from Sofienberg kirke, (Jan Erik Kongshaug (sound engineer), produced by Kornstad)
Symphonies in My Head (Jazzland Recordings, 2011), with recordings from Sofienberg kirke, (produced by Kornstad)

With Håkon Kornstad Trio
Space available (Jazzland Recordings, 2001)
Live from Kongsberg (Jazzland Recordings, 2003)

With Håkon Kornstad Band
Tenor Battle (Jazzland Recordings, 2015)

With Kornstad Ensemble and the Norwegian Radio Orchestra
Kornstad + KORK Live (Grappa Music, 2017)

As co-leader 
With Wibutee
Newborn Thing (Jazzland Recordings, 1998)
Eight Domestic Challenges (Jazzland Recordings, 2001)
Playmachine (Jazzland Recordings, 2004)
Sweet Mental (Sonne Disk, 2006)

With Tri-Dim
Tri-Dimprovisations (bp, 1999)
Tri-Dim feat. Barry Guy (Sofa Recordings, 2001)

With Håvard Wiik (duo)
Eight Tunes We Like (Moserobie, 2005)
The Bad and the Beautiful (Moserobie, 2006)

With Maria Kannegaard
Maryland (Moserobie, 2008)
Maryland – Live! (Moserobie, 2009)

With Ingebrigt Håker Flaten and Jon Christensen
Mitt hjerte alltid vanker (Compunctio, 2011)
Mitt hjerte alltid vanker II (Compunctio, 2011)

With others
Schlinger (Smalltown Supersound, 2003), with Paal Nilssen-Love
Jazzland Community (Jazzland Recordings, 2007), with various artists
Rite (Grappa, 2008), with Unni Løvlid
Elise (Compunctio, 2008), with Ingebrigt Håker Flaten

As sideman 
With Ketil Bjørnstad
A Passion for John Donne (ECM, 2014)

With Sternklang
My Time is Yours (2003)
Transistor Beach (2006)

With No Spaghetti Edition
Listen ... and tell me what it was (Sofa Recordings, 2001)
Pasta variations (Sofa Recordings, 2002)

With others
Glow (Curling Legs, 2000), with Jacob Young
Moving (Jazzland Recordings, 2001), with Bugge Wesseltoft
Open Reminder (Melektronikk, 2004), with ARM
Retrospective (F Communications, 2006), with Laurent Garnier
"Liarbird" (Jazzland Recordings, 2011), with Ola Kvernberg

References

External links 

20th-century Norwegian male singers
20th-century Norwegian singers
21st-century Norwegian male singers
21st-century Norwegian singers
20th-century Norwegian saxophonists
21st-century Norwegian saxophonists
Norwegian operatic tenors
Norwegian jazz saxophonists
Norwegian jazz composers
Male jazz composers
Norwegian University of Science and Technology alumni
Musicians from Oslo
1977 births
Living people
20th-century saxophonists
Wibutee members
Jazzland Recordings (1997) artists
Smalltown Supersound artists
Grappa Music artists